The Lowest Animal, also titled Man's Place in the Animal World, is a philosophical essay written by American author Mark Twain in 1897 or 1905. Twain describes fictional experiments he did with animals in which they showed greater civility than humans. He uses satire in order to criticize humanity's continuous desire for power. The original source was prefaced by newspaper clippings which, apparently, dealt with religious persecutions in Crete. The clippings have been lost.

Summary 
In the essay Twain satirizes human nature by describing a series of experiments he supposedly conducted at the London Zoological Gardens. Twain takes Darwin's evolution theory that humans evolved from earlier ancestors, or “lower animals,” and reverses it. He describes deeds done by powerful people against the helpless, and states the many ideas that made him ponder about the lack of humanity. He ends the essay with these words: "And it is full of a grim suggestion: that we are not as important, perhaps, as we had all along supposed we were."

References 

Essays by Mark Twain
Philosophical literature
1896 in the United States
1896 in literature